Pedro Aguayo Damián (18 January 1946 — 3 July 2019) better known as "(El) Perro Aguayo" (Aguayo the dog) and El Can de Nochistlan (The Nochistlan Dog) was a Mexican wrestler through the 1970s to the 1990s.

Aguayo was the first person ever crowned the WWF Light Heavyweight Champion, though pre-1997 title reigns are not included in WWE's official history for that title. In 2012, Aguayo was inducted into the AAA Hall of Fame. Aguayo was notably the last major rival of El Santo. Often prone to blading, Aguayo has been described by American pundits as a cross between Terry Funk and Bruno Sammartino (for his willingness to brawl and overpower opponents). One of the biggest box office attractions in lucha libre history, prominent professional wrestling journalist and historian Dave Meltzer described Aguayo as "one of the hardest working and most charismatic wrestlers ever".

Aguayo's son also wrestled as Perro Aguayo Jr. or El Hijo del Perro Aguayo ("The Son of Perro Aguayo").

Professional wrestling career 
Aguayo was synonymous with the Universal Wrestling Association (UWA) as one of its top heels and one of the top heels in lucha libre overall. In the 1990s, Aguayo helped found Asistencia Asesoría y Administración, later known simply as AAA, and his three-way feud with Konnan and Cien Caras proved to be one of the most successful programs in terms of box office receipts. He stayed with AAA until 2000, even making an appearance on WWF's Royal Rumble in 1997 in a match that featured lucha libre legends like El Canek, Mil Máscaras and up and comers who would later make names for themselves like Héctor Garza and Heavy Metal. He came to Consejo Mundial de Lucha Libre to feud with Los Capos. He was successful in taking the hair of Cien Caras and Máscara Año 2000 but he lost his slated retirement match against Universo 2000. He remained in retirement until his son began feuding with Los Capos as well. Cien Caras claimed he could not retire until his business with Aguayo was finished so a double hair vs. hair match was set with Perro Aguayo and Perro Aguayo Jr. taking on Cien Caras and Máscara Año 2000. The Aguayos were successful and Perro Aguayo returned to retirement and Cien Caras went into semi-retirement.

On 5 August 2012, at Triplemanía XX, Aguayo was inducted into the AAA Hall of Fame.

Personal life 
He was the father of the Los Perros del Mal stable founder Perro Aguayo Jr., who died on 21 March 2015,  during a wrestling match at the age of 35.

Death 
On 3 July 2019, Aguayo died at the age of 73, his death was announced through a social media post by the "Los Perros del Mal" account. According to them, his death was caused by a heart attack. His funeral was held on 4 July in Guadalajara at a Funeraria Gayosso. On 5 July, a mass was held for Aguayo at the Parque Funeral Colonias de Guadalajara, the same place where in 2015 he farewell his son Perro Aguayo Jr., with the attendance of family, friends and fans before ultimately being cremated.

Championships and accomplishments 
Asistencia Asesoría y Administración
AAA Campeón de Campeones Championship (1 time)
IWC World Heavyweight Championship (1 time)
Mexican National Heavyweight Championship (1 time)
Mexican National Tag Team Championship (2 times) - with Perro Aguayo Jr.
Rey de Reyes 1998
AAA Hall of Fame (Class of 2012)
Empresa Mexicana de Lucha Libre
NWA World Middleweight Championship (3 times)
Occidente Middleweight Championship (1 time)
Universal Wrestling Association
Mexican National Middleweight Championship (1 time)
UWA World Heavyweight Championship (1 time)
UWA World Lightweight Championship (1 time)
UWA World Light Heavyweight Championship (1 time)
UWA World Junior Light Heavyweight Championship (2 times)
UWA World Tag Team Championship (1 time) - with Gran Hamada
WWF Light Heavyweight Championship (7 times)
World Wrestling Association
WWA World Heavyweight Championship (3 times)
World Wrestling Council
WWC World Junior Heavyweight Championship (1 time)
World Wrestling Federation
WWF Intercontinental Tag Team Championship (1 time, inaugural and final) – with Gran Hamada
Pro Wrestling Illustrated
PWI ranked him # 38 of the 500 best singles wrestlers during the "PWI Years" in 2003.
Wrestling Observer Newsletter awards
Best Babyface (1995)
Wrestling Observer Newsletter Hall of Fame (Class of 1996)

Luchas de Apuestas record

Notes

References
General sources - Championship Information

General sources - Career

 
Specific

1946 births
2019 deaths
20th-century professional wrestlers
21st-century professional wrestlers
Mexican male professional wrestlers
Professional wrestlers from Zacatecas
People from Nochistlán
Mexican National Middleweight Champions
Mexican National Tag Team Champions
NWA World Middleweight Champions
UWA World Junior Light Heavyweight Champions
UWA World Heavyweight Champions
UWA World Light Heavyweight Champions